KATY-FM (101.3 MHz, "KATY 101.3"), is a commercial radio station serving to the southwestern portion of the Riverside-San Bernardino, California radio market.  KATY-FM is licensed to Idyllwild, California, with its studios and offices in Temecula, California.  It broadcasts a Soft AC radio format, described as "Lite & Refreshing."

KATY-FM is independently owned and operated by the parent company, All Pro Broadcasting, which is owned by the estate of the late Green Bay Packers star Willie Davis.  It is a sister station to "Hot 103.9" KHTI in Lake Arrowhead, California.

The current on-air staff include Erica, Mia D, Rick Shaw, Chris Ramone, Bernard, and JP Raineri.  KATY-FM carries the nationally syndicated John Tesh Radio Show.

History
On December 1, 1989, it signed on the air, founded by Kay Sadler-Gill, at a time when few women owned radio stations.    Sadler-Gill's nickname is "Katy," which is reflected in the station's call sign.

In 2001, the station was purchased by All-Pro Broadcasting for $3.5 million. On January 16 KATY switched their format to Soft AC and rebranded as KATY 101.3 Lite & Refreshing

References

External links
 Katy 101.3 Official Website

ATY-FM
Soft adult contemporary radio stations in the United States
Mainstream adult contemporary radio stations in the United States
Mass media in Riverside County, California
Mass media in San Bernardino County, California
Radio stations established in 1989
1989 establishments in California